The Southern Gothic is an American music group with an Americana sound that leans heavily on country and southern rock roots. Known to fans as SoGo, originally from Atlanta, now based in Nashville, Tennessee The Southern Gothic is composed of Connor Christian, Shawn Thacker, Yannie Reynecke and Quinn Loggins.

The group was formed in 2007 as Connor Christian & the Morningstar Revival. Under the name "Connor Christian & Southern Gothic," they released 2 studio albums. The 2013 album New Hometown sold 5,000 copies in its first week of release, debuting in the Top 20 of the Billboard Top Country Albums chart and at number one on the Top Heatseekers chart. In January 2014, the band recorded a double-live album entitled "Shuffle & Stomp," as well as its first full-length concert DVD entitled "CCSG Live in Atlanta."

In 2015, the band re-branded as "The Southern Gothic" and relocated to Nashville to record a new album. After taking a four-year hiatus to work on individual projects, the band reformed in late 2018 and released a stand-alone single, "Let it Ride," on April 19, 2019. Though pushed back several times due to Covid, their newest single and EP ("Past Midnight" and "Burnin' Moonlight" respectively), was released on December 4, 2020.

Discography

Studio albums

Live albums

Music videos

References

External links

Country music groups from Georgia (U.S. state)
Musical groups established in 2007
American southern rock musical groups